New Holland is a village in Fayette and Pickaway counties in Ohio, United States.  The population was 801 at the 2010 census.

The Pickaway County portion of New Holland is part of the Columbus Metropolitan Statistical Area, while the Fayette County portion is part of the Washington Court House Micropolitan Statistical Area.

History
The village was named after Holland, the native land of a share of the first settlers.

Geography
New Holland is located at  (39.553515, -83.259382).

Demographics

2010 census
As of the census of 2010, there were 801 people, 308 households, and 212 families living in the village. The racial makeup of the village was 97.6% White, 0.2% African American, 0.4% Native American, 0.2% Asian, 1.0% from other races, and 0.5% from two or more races. Hispanic or Latino people of any race were 1.0% of the population.

There were 308 households, of which 33.8% had children under the age of 18 living with them, 51.3% were married couples living together, 9.4% had a female householder with no husband present, 8.1% had a male householder with no wife present, and 31.2% were non-families. 22.4% of all households were made up of individuals, and 11.4% had someone living alone who was 65 years of age or older. The average household size was 2.60 and the average family size was 3.06.

The median age in the village was 41.2 years. 22.7% of residents were under the age of 18; 8.3% were between the ages of 18 and 24; 24.3% were from 25 to 44; 30% were from 45 to 64; and 14.5% were 65 years of age or older. The gender makeup of the village was 50.4% male and 49.6% female.

2000 census
As of the census of 2000, there were 785 people, 313 households, and 220 families living in the village. The population density was 420.1 people per square mile (162.1/km2). There were 331 housing units at an average density of 177.1 per square mile (68.3/km2). The racial makeup of the village was 97.58% White, 0.38% African American, 0.38% Native American, and 1.66% from two or more races. Hispanic or Latino people of any race were 0.25% of the population.

There were 313 households, out of which 29.7% had children under the age of 18 living with them, 56.2% were married couples living together, 10.2% had a female householder with no husband present, and 29.4% were non-families. 25.6% of all households were made up of individuals, and 16.0% had someone living alone who was 65 years of age or older. The average household size was 2.51 and the average family size was 3.00.

In the village, the population was spread out, with 24.5% under the age of 18, 8.2% from 18 to 24, 27.9% from 25 to 44, 23.4% from 45 to 64, and 16.1% who were 65 years of age or older. The median age was 37 years. For every 100 females there were 94.8 males. For every 100 females age 18 and over, there were 90.7 males.

The median income for a household in the village was $32,188, and the median income for a family was $36,696. Males had a median income of $30,625 versus $24,191 for females. The per capita income for the village was $15,613. About 4.4% of families and 7.9% of the population were below the poverty line, including 5.5% of those under age 18 and 14.7% of those age 65 or over.

Notable residents
 Terry Lyons, baseball player

Gallery

References

External links
 New Holland, Ohio website

Villages in Fayette County, Ohio
Villages in Pickaway County, Ohio
Villages in Ohio